Odile Schmitt (November 5, 1956 – March 24, 2020) was a French actress. She often dubbed the French language-versions of films featuring Eva Longoria.

Biography
Schmitt was educated at the Conservatoire de Strasbourg. She took courses alongside Andréas Voutsinas and John Strasberg. Her first dubbing appearance was in The Mysterious Cities of Gold in 1982. After dubbing Eva Longoria in The Young and the Restless, Schmitt became the regular dubber for the American actress. Odile Schmitt died on 24 March 2020 after a long illness.

Theatre
Les Feux de la Gloire (2002)
Les Feux de la Gloire (2004–2005)
Amour, Gore et Beauté (2009)
Andromaque (2009–2011)
Les Justes (2012–2013)

Filmography

References

External links

1956 births
2020 deaths
French film actresses
French stage actresses
French video game actresses
French voice actresses
French voice directors
20th-century French actresses
21st-century French actresses